Edward Somerset may refer to:

Edward Somerset, 4th Earl of Worcester (bef. 1568–1628), English aristocrat, adviser to James I, serving as Lord Privy Seal
Edward Somerset, 2nd Marquess of Worcester (1601?–1667), styled Lord Herbert of Raglan, English nobleman, son of Henry Somerset, 1st Marquess of Worcester 
Lord Edward Somerset (1776–1842), British soldier, son of the 5th Duke of Beaufort
Edward Arthur Somerset (1817–1886),  British army general and politician, the son of Lord Robert Edward Henry Somerset